Shaunak Sen is an Indian filmmaker, video artist and film scholar. His documentary film on environmental issues, All That Breathes, won the Grand Jury Prize in the World Cinema Documentary Competition at 2022 Sundance Film Festival and the Golden Eye award for the best documentary at 2022 Cannes Film Festival. It was also nominated for the Academy Award for Best Documentary Feature.

Education
Sen graduated in Mass Communication from A.J.K. Mass Communication Research Centre Jamia Milia, New Delhi, and obtained a Ph.D. from the School of Arts and Aesthetics at the Jawaharlal Nehru University in Delhi. His academic and early professional work won support from various organizations, including the Films Division of India Documentary Fellowship (2013), CSDS-Sarai Digital and Social Media Fellowship (2014), Pro Helvetia Residency (2016) and the Charles Wallace Fellowship (2018). He also participated in Cambridge University's ERC Urban Ecologies project as a visiting scholar in 2018.

Career
Sen, along with Amitesh Grover and Frank Oberhausser, co-conceptualized Downtime, a live installation event across Delhi and Berlin that allowed audiences to explore practices across sleep in public territories, private spaces, and digitally networked environments. With Arnika Ahldag and Grover, he was co-curator of Notes on Mourning, a live performance and video installation in January 2015. He was also part of the Copycat Academy Residency, curated by Hannah Hurtzig at the Luminato Film Festival in Toronto in June 2015.

Sen's first feature-length documentary, a "sensitive unpacking of the geographies of homelessness and sleep in Delhi", Cities of Sleep funded by the Films Division of India was released in 2016. The film was screened at 16th edition of the New York Indian Film Festival,  Taiwan International Documentary Festival, and Mumbai International Film Festival. Screened at over 20 other international festivals, the documentary won six awards.

Sen's second feature length documentary All That Breathes premiered on 21 January 2022 in the Sundance Film Festival's World Cinema Documentary Competition. 
Two brothers Saud and Nadeem were raised in New Delhi, looking at a sky speckled with black kites, watching as relatives tossed meat up to these birds of prey. Muslim belief held that feeding the kites would expel troubles. Now, birds are falling from the polluted, opaque skies of New Delhi and the two brothers have made it their life’s work to care for the injured black kites.

The documentary won the World Cinema Grand Jury Prize: Documentary at the Sundance Film Festival, with one juror saying "This poetic film delivers an urgent political story while constructing a singular and loving portrait of protagonists resisting seemingly inevitable ecological disaster – with humorous touches punctuated by unsentimental depiction of the animal kingdom." The documentary also won the L'Œil d'or (Golden Eye), the top award for documentary films, at the 75th Cannes Film Festival in 2022, with the jury saying "The Golden Eye goes to a film that, in a world of destruction, reminds us that every life matters, and every small action matters. You can grab your camera, you can save a bird, you can hunt for some moments of stealing beauty, it matters. It's an inspirational journey in observation of three Don Quixotes who may not save the whole world but do save their world."

Following the Cannes screening of All That Breathes, HBO announced that it had acquired worldwide television rights to the documentary. A theatrical release in the USA through Submarine Deluxe and Sideshow was followed by a release on HBO Max.

Filmography

Accolades

References

External links
 

Living people
Year of birth missing (living people)
People from Delhi
Indian filmmakers
Indian screenwriters
Indian directors